The 2018 Koser Jewelers Tennis Challenge was a professional tennis tournament played on outdoor hard courts. It was the twelfth edition of the tournament and was part of the 2018 ITF Women's Circuit. It took place in Landisville, United States, on 6–12 August 2018.

Singles main draw entrants

Seeds 

 1 Rankings as of 30 July 2018.

Other entrants 
The following players received a wildcard into the singles main draw:
  Gail Brodsky
  Sophie Chang
  Lauren Davis
  Joelle Kissell

The following player received entry using a protected ranking:
  Olga Govortsova
  Jessica Pegula

The following player received entry by a special exempt:
  Ann Li

The following players received entry from the qualifying draw:
  Kimberly Birrell
  Hayley Carter
  Risa Ozaki
  Jessika Ponchet

The following players received entry as a lucky loser:
  Eri Hozumi

Champions

Singles

 Madison Brengle def.  Kristie Ahn, 6–4, 1–0, ret.

Doubles

 Ellen Perez /  Arina Rodionova def.  Chen Pei-hsuan /  Wu Fang-hsien, 6–0, 6–2

External links 
 2018 Koser Jewelers Tennis Challenge at ITFtennis.com
 Official website

2018 ITF Women's Circuit
2018 in American sports
Tennis tournaments in the United States